Pattampoochi is a 1975 Indian Tamil-language drama film directed by A. S. Pragasam, starring Kamal Haasan and Jayachitra. The film marked the debut of Kamal Haasan as a leading actor. It was released on 21 February 1975.

Cast 
 Kamal Haasan as 'Sandiyar' Siva
 Jayachitra as Meena
 Nagesh as Vadivelu
 V. K. Ramasamy as Vedhasalam
 Manorama as Kumari (guest appearance)
Senthamarai as Bashyam
 Pakoda Kadhar
 P.R Varalakshmi
 Shanmugasundaram
 Rathnakumar
 s s sounder

Soundtrack 
The music was composed by M. B. Sreenivasan.

Release and reception 
Pattampoochi was released on 21 February 1975. The film was a success. Kanthan of Kalki praised both the title and screenplay to be different, performances of Kamal and Jayachithra while also praising the film for breaking stereotypes of Tamil cinema by portraying the film's lead actor as traitor but felt the film's initial pace died down after the interval.

References

External links 
 

1970s Tamil-language films
1975 drama films
1975 films
Films scored by M. B. Sreenivasan
Indian drama films